Antarctospira falklandica is a species of sea snail, a marine gastropod mollusk in the family Borsoniidae.

Description
The length of the shell attains 16 mm.

Distribution
This marine species occurs off the Falkland Islands and Strait Of Magellan, east of Mouth, Tierra del Fuego, Argentina, South Atlantic Ocean

References

External links
 Kantor Y.I., Harasewych M.G. & Puillandre N. (2016). A critical review of Antarctic Conoidea (Neogastropoda). Molluscan Research. 36(3): 153-206

falklandica
Gastropods described in 1951